Dalun is a town of Jiangyan District, Taizhou in south-central Jiangsu province, China. , it has 2 residential communities and 16 villages under its administration.

See also 
 List of township-level divisions of Jiangsu

References 

Township-level divisions of Jiangsu
Taizhou, Jiangsu